Hibifolin is a flavonol glycoside that prevents beta-amyloid-induced neurotoxicity in vitro.

References

Flavonol glycosides